HMS Ajax was a 74-gun third rate ship of the line of the Royal Navy, built by Thomas Bucknall at Portsmouth Dockyard and launched on 23 December 1767. She was designed by William Bateley, and was the only ship built to her draught. She had a crew of 600 men.

She saw extensive action in the War of American Independence, taking part in the Battles of Cape St. Vincent, the Chesapeake, St. Kitts and the Saintes.

She was driven ashore and damaged at Saint Lucia in the Great Hurricane of 1780 but was recovered.

On 12 April 1782 she saw action against the French fleet at the Battle of the Saintes under command of Captain Nicholas Charrington.

She was sold in 1785.

Commanders of note
John Carter Allen (later Admiral Allen)
Philip Boteler
Robert Linzee (later Admiral Linzee)
Samuel Uvedale
John Symons

Notes

References
Lavery, Brian (2003) The Ship of the Line - Volume 1: The development of the battlefleet 1650-1850. Conway Maritime Press. .

Ships of the line of the Royal Navy
1767 ships
Maritime incidents in 1780